The Light Bulb Conspiracy, also known as Pyramids of Waste, is a 2010 documentary film written and directed by Cosima Dannoritzer. An international co-production of France and Spain, the documentary thematizes the planned obsolescence of industrial products for commercial reasons.

Synopsis
The film documents planned obsolescence in industrial production, i.e. the deliberate limitation by manufacturers of the lifespan of their products in order to thereby secure the sale of replacement and follow-up products. In addition to describing concrete examples, the film also deals with the economic and ecological consequences of consumer society. Among others, the French economist and philosopher Serge Latouche has his say as a representative of the concept of degrowth.

Documented examples 
 The Centennial Light is considered to be the longest-lasting incandescent lamp in the world. It is used as evidence of collusion among incandescent lamp manufacturers in the Phoebus cartel, one of whose aims was to limit the average lifespan of lightbulbs to 1000 hours.
 The market strategy of Alfred P. Sloan, president of General Motors from 1923 to 1937, is used to illustrate the entry of planned obsolescence into the automotive industry.
 In the context of the Great Depression, Bernard London proposed in his work Ending the Depression Through Planned Obsolescence that all products be given an expiration date, after which they would have to be turned in to a government agency and destroyed. In this way, consumption was to be stimulated and jobs created.
 The Narva brand light bulb, which is also very durable, is treated as further evidence of the existence of planned obsolescence in modern light bulbs.
 Particularly resistant nylon pantyhoses are said to have been made more short-lived for the purpose of faster wear by using inferior material.
 The Epson Stylus C42UX inkjet printer is said to issue a defect message after a certain number of printed pages, whereupon further use of the printer is prevented. This lock, which is said to be caused by a chip specially present for this purpose, could be switched off with the help of special software.
 The battery of the iPod Classic is used as an example of planned obsolescence in modern consumer electronics.

International versions 
The film screened internationally at numerous film festivals as well as on television and was broadcast on German television several times on Arte and Phoenix starting in 2011. In the same year, it ran as a side event at the European Commission's Green Week.

Internationally, it was shown with the following titles:

 Catalan: Comprar, llençar, comprar
 Czech: Žárovková konspirace - Příběh plánovaného zastarávání
 Danish: Glødepære-konspiration
 English: The Light Bulb Conspiracy
 Finnish: Hehkulamppuhuijaus
 French: Prêt-à-jeter
 German: Kaufen für die Müllhalde
 Hungarian: A Villanykörte Összeesküvés – A tervezett elavulás története
 Italian: Il complotto della lampadina
 Norwegian: Garantert kort levetid
 Polish:Spisek żarówkowy
 Portuguese: A Conspiração da Lâmpada
 Russian: Заговор вокруг лампочки
 Spanish: Comprar, tirar, comprar
 Swedish: Glödlampskonspirationen
 Turkish: Ampul Komplosu

Awards 
 Best Documentary in Science, Technology and Education Award of the Guangzhou International Documentary Film Festival (GZDOC) 2010, China
 Best Documentary, Spanish Television Academy Awards, 2011
 Best Film, SCINEMA 2011, Australia
 Best Feature Documentary, Filmambiente 2011, Brazil
 Maeda Special Prize, NHK Japan Prize 2011
 Ondas Internacional 2011, Spanien (Mitgewinner: Joan Úbeda, Executive Producer)
 Special Jury Mention, FICMA 2011, Spanien
 Best Popular-Science Film - People and Environment 2012 (Russia)
 Best International Film - Kuala Lumpur Eco Film Festival (KLEFF) 2012 Malaysia
 Prix Tournesol for Best Environmental Documentary Film - Festival du Film Vert Suisse (Lausanne)
 Hoimar-von-Ditfurth-Preis of the Deutsche Umwelthilfe for best journalistic performance, Ökofilmtour 2013
 Finalist, Focal International Awards 2011, London, U.K.
 Finalist, Magnolia Awards, Shanghai International Film Festival 2011, China
 Finalist, Prix Europa 2011, Berlin

Literature 
Three years after the premiere of the film, the documentary was published as a book.

 Cosima Dannoritzer, Jürgen Reuß Kaufen für die Müllhalde. Das Prinzip der geplanten Obsoleszenz. orange-press, Freiburg (2013)

References

External links 
 
 Streaming of The Light Bulb Conspiracy in English at YouTube
 Streaming of The Light Bulb Conspiracy in German at Vimeo
 Official Website of Cosima Dannoritzer

2010 films
2010 documentary films
Documentary films about business
Documentary films about consumerism
Documentary films about environmental issues
Documentary films about conspiracy theories
French documentary films
Spanish documentary films
2010s Spanish films
2010s French films